Dominica Broadcasting Corporation (also known on-air as DBS or DBS Radio) is the national radio station of the Commonwealth of Dominica. The service, owned by the local government, is headquartered on Victoria Street in the island's capital, Roseau.

The company was founded in 1971 as Radio Dominica, and upon its launch replaced programming provided to the island by WIBS, the Windward Islands Broadcasting Service of Grenada. Among its earliest series were The Dominica Story (before its publication) and Espewans Kweyol.

DBS is heard on 88.1 FM in Roseau and environs, and its signal is picked up across the Eastern Caribbean.

See also
Kairi FM
Q95 FM

External links
Official site

Mass media companies established in 1971
Mass media in Dominica
Radio stations in the Caribbean
Radio stations established in 1971
Publicly funded broadcasters